Maly Mogoy is a rural locality (a selo) in Bolshemogoysky Selsoviet of Volodarsky District, Astrakhan Oblast, Russia. The population was 95 as of 2010. There are 2 streets.

Geography 
Maly Mogoy is located on the Sarbay River, 21 km southeast of Volodarsky (the district's administrative centre) by road. Bolshoy Mogoy is the nearest rural locality.

References 

Rural localities in Volodarsky District, Astrakhan Oblast